Yiyun Li (born November 4, 1972) is a Chinese-born writer and professor in the United States. Her short stories and novels have won several awards, including the PEN/Hemingway Award and Guardian First Book Award for A Thousand Years of Good Prayers, and the 2020 PEN/Jean Stein Book Award for Where Reasons End. She is an editor of the Brooklyn-based literary magazine A Public Space.

Biography
Yiyun was born and raised in Beijing, China. Her mother was a teacher and her father worked as a nuclear physicist. Following a compulsory year of service in the People's Liberation Army, she went on to earn a B.S. at Peking University in 1996. In the same year she moved to the US and in 2000 earned an MS in immunology at The University of Iowa. In 2005 she earned an MFA degree in creative nonfiction and fiction from The Nonfiction Writing Program and the Writers' Workshop at the University of Iowa. Her stories and essays have been published in The New Yorker, The Paris Review, and Zoetrope: All-Story. Two of the stories from A Thousand Years of Good Prayers were adapted into 2007 films directed by Wayne Wang: The Princess of Nebraska and the title story, which Yiyun adapted herself.

Li had a breakdown in 2012 and attempted suicide twice. After recuperating and leaving the hospital, she lost interest in writing fiction and for a whole year she focused on reading several biographies, memoirs, diaries and journals. According to her, reading about other people's lives "was a comfort". She has taught fiction at the University of California, Davis, and is a professor of creative writing at the Lewis Center for the Arts at Princeton University.

Award and honours
Lannan Foundation residency in Marfa, Texas
2005 – Frank O'Connor International Short Story Award for A Thousand Years of Good Prayers
2006 – PEN/Hemingway Award for A Thousand Years of Good Prayers
2006 – Guardian First Book Award for A Thousand Years of Good Prayers
2006 –Whiting Award
California Book Award first fiction award for A Thousand Years of Good Prayers
2007 – Granta's 21 Best of Young American Novelists
California Book Award for The Vagrants
2010 – The New Yorkers 20 under 40
2010 – MacArthur Foundation fellow
2010 – Story Prize finalist for Gold Boy, Emerald Girl
2011 – International Dublin Literary Award shortlist for The Vagrants
2011 – Frank O'Connor International Short Story Award shortlist for Gold Boy, Emerald Girl.
2014 – The American Academy of Arts and Letters's Benjamin H. Danks Award
2015 – Sunday Times EFG Private Bank Short Story Award winner for "A Sheltered Woman".
 2020 – PEN/Jean Stein Book Award for Where Reasons End
2020 – Windham-Campbell Literature Prize
2020 – Guggenheim Fellowship
2022 – PEN/Malamud Award

Bibliography

Novels

Short fiction
Collections

Short stories

Memoir

Essays and reporting

References

External links

Profile at The Whiting Foundation
"The Rumpus Interview with Yiyun Li", January 14, 2009
January 2009 interview with Yiyun Li
"Executioner Songs", The Wall Street Journal, JANUARY 30, 2009
"Interviews: Yiyun Li", Identity Theory
Articles by Yuyun Li on her UK publisher's blog, 5th Estate
Yiyun Li speaks about Gold Boy, Emerald Girl on KRUI's The Lit Show
Video: The Story Prize reading with Anthony Doerr and Suzanne Rivecca. March 2, 2011.

1972 births
Living people
21st-century Chinese novelists
21st-century Chinese short story writers
21st-century Chinese women writers
Chinese emigrants to the United States
Exophonic writers
University of Iowa alumni
Iowa Writers' Workshop alumni
Peking University alumni
MacArthur Fellows
University of California, Davis faculty
Princeton University faculty
Hemingway Foundation/PEN Award winners
The New Yorker people
Writers from Beijing
O. Henry Award winners